A list of science fiction films released in the 1920s. These films include core elements of science fiction and are widely available with reviews by reputable critics or film historians.

See also
History of science fiction films

References

 
1920s
Lists of 1920s films by genre